NGC 2035 (also known as ESO 56-EN161 and the Dragon's Head Nebula) is an emission nebula and a H II region in the Dorado constellation and part of the Large Magellanic Cloud.  It was discovered by James Dunlop on August 3, 1826.  Its apparent size is 3.0.

NGC 2035 is part of a complex of nebulae and stars, including NGC 2029, NGC 2032 and NGC 2040, found north of the main bar of the LMC.  It consists of large bright gas clouds which are separated by dark dust clouds.  NGC 2029, NGC 2032 and NGC 2035 are star-forming regions, while NGC 2040 is a supernova remnant which contains an open cluster.

References

Emission nebulae
ESO objects
2035
H II regions
Large Magellanic Cloud
Dorado (constellation)
Astronomical objects discovered in 1826